Perry Banks (24 April 1877 in Victoria, British Columbia Canada – 10 October 1934 in Santa Barbara, California) was a Canadian silent film actor.

He starred with William Garwood in films such as Sir Galahad of Twilight.

Selected filmography
 Redbird Wins (1914)
 Sir Galahad of Twilight (1914)
 Mein Lieber Katrina Catches a Convict (1914)
 The Widow's Investment (1914)
 A Blowout at Santa Banana (1914)
 The Assayer of Lone Gap (1915)
 The Little Lady Next Door (1915)
 In Trust (1915)
 The Secret of the Submarine (1915)
 The Legend Beautiful (1915)
 A Sporting Chance (1919)
 Eve in Exile (1919)
 Six Feet Four (1919)
 The House of Toys (1920)

External links
 

1877 births
1934 deaths
Canadian male film actors
Canadian male silent film actors
Male actors from Victoria, British Columbia
20th-century Canadian male actors